Haugesund is a municipality on the North Sea in Rogaland county, Norway. While the population is greater in the neighboring Karmøy municipality, the main commercial and economic centre of the Haugaland region in northern Rogaland and southern Vestland is in Haugesund. The majority of the population of Haugesund lives in the Haugesund urban area in the municipality's southwest. The majority of the municipality outside this area is rural or undeveloped.

The  municipality is the 338th largest by area out of the 356 municipalities in Norway. Haugesund is the 28th most populous municipality in Norway with a population of 37,444.

Only about 1,000 residents of Haugesund municipality that live in the  rural portion of the municipality.

Location
The town is situated on a strategically important sound, the Karmsundet, through which ships could pass without traversing heavy seas. In the early years, the coastal waters off Haugesund were a huge source of herring, and the town grew accordingly. Despite being barely a village back then, King Harald Fairhair lived at Avaldsnes, very close to the modern town of Haugesund. In the last decades, the town, like its neighbours, has been turning towards the petroleum industry, with the herring being long gone.

During the last 20 years, the municipality has established its position as the main trading centre for the Haugaland region and southern parts of Vestland county. It has several relatively large shopping centres, however, this has led to a decline of the trade and shopping activity in the town centre.

The Haugesund Region, a statistical metropolitan area, which consists of the municipalities Karmøy, Haugesund, Tysvær, Sveio and Bokn, has a population of approximately 100,000 people (as of 2009).

History

Despite being a fairly young town, the areas surrounding Haugesund were lands of power during the Viking Age. Harald Fairhair was the first king of Norway. He had his home in Avaldsnes, also known as Homeland of the Viking Kings, only 8 km (4.9 mi) from the present town. After his death in c. 940, it is believed Fairhair was buried at Haraldshaugen, a burial mound adjacent to the Karmsundet strait. This site is the namesake of the town and municipality of Haugesund. The national monument at Haraldshaugen was raised in 1872, to commemorate the 1000th anniversary of the Battle of Hafrsfjord in 872. The Battle of Hafrsfjord has traditionally been regarded as when western Norway was unified under a single monarch for the first time.

Haugesund has a strong historical bond to the sea and especially the herring. In the earlier years, the coastal waters of Haugesund were a huge source for fishing herring, and the town grew accordingly. The protective straits of Smedasund and Karmsund gave the town potential to grow in both fishing and shipping. Even to this day, Karmsund is one of Norway's busiest waterways. The town is still growing geographically even though the population has increased only moderately the last decade. Today the herring is long gone, and the town is turning more and more towards the petroleum industry, like its neighbouring town to the south, Stavanger.

Municipal history
The urban village area of Haugesund (population: 1,066) was declared to be a "town" and it was separated from the surrounding municipality of Torvastad on 1 February 1855 to become a separate municipality of its own. On 1 January 1911, a small urban area of Skåre (population: 3,847) that directly abutted the town of Haugesund was transferred to Haugesund. On 1 January 1958, the remainder of the municipality of Skåre was merged with the town of Haugesund, creating a larger Haugesund municipality. On 1 January 1965, the island of Vibrandsøy (population: 70) was transferred from Torvastad municipality to Haugesund.

Etymology
The town is named after the Haugesundet strait. The first element (Hauge) goes back to the genitive plural of the Old Norse word haugr meaning hill or mound. The last element is sund meaning strait.

Coat of arms
The coat of arms for Haugesund was granted on 5 March 1930. They were designed by Hallvard Trætteberg. The arms are blue with three silver/white seagulls lined up vertically. The seagulls and blue color were chosen to represent the importance of the sea. These arms replaced the old coat of arms that were granted on 29 December 1862. The old arms showed three herring barrels, an anchor, and three seagulls. The old arms showed the importance of herring fishing and processing in the town. The three barrels also represented the three parts of the municipality: the mainland and the islands of Hasseløy and Risøy. The new arms from 1930 removed the herring barrels due to the decline in the importance of that industry.

Geography and climate

Haugesund  municipality has a coastline with the North Sea, however, the island of Karmøy and the archipelago of Røvær shelter it from the rough waters of the ocean. The Karmsundet strait, located between Karmøy and Haugesund used to be very strategically important, since ships could pass without having to sail through heavy sea. Haugesund's city centre has a distinctive street layout, similar to those found in Kristiansand and Oslo.
The municipality includes several islands. Risøy and Hasseløy are densely built, and connected to the mainland by bridges. Røvær which lies further out and consists of a number of islands, is also populated and connected to the mainland by ferry. Vibrandsøy and its neighboring islands are now mainly a recreational area. Røværsholmen Lighthouse sits just off the coast of the main Røvær island. The lakes Vigdarvatnet and Stakkastadvatnet are located in the municipality.

Haugesund has an oceanic climate (Cfb, marine west coast) with rainy winters and mild and pleasant summers. The all-time high  was recorded July 2019, and the all-time low  was set in January 2010 (extremes since 2003). The wettest time of year is autumn and winter, while April–July is the driest season.

Cityscape

Haugesund City Hall was built in 1931, celebrating its 75th anniversary in 2006. The pink city hall, designed by Gudolf Blakstad and Herman Munthe-Kaas, is one of the finest neo-classical buildings in Norway, and has been elected the most beautiful building in Haugesund. It is also included in the new Norwegian edition of the game Monopoly after it was successful in a national vote. The building may not be altered in any way without permission from the national preservation agency. It overlooks the town square and a park which was inaugurated on 28 August 1949.

During the last 20 years, the municipality has established its position as the main trading centre for the Haugaland region and southern parts of Vestland county. It has several relatively large shopping centres, however, this has led to a decline of the trade and shopping activity in the town centre.

There are several churches in the town of Haugesund including Vår Frelsers Church, Udland Church, Rossabø Church, and Skåre Church.

Government
All municipalities in Norway, including Haugesund, are responsible for primary education (through 10th grade), outpatient health services, senior citizen services, unemployment and other social services, zoning, economic development, and municipal roads. The municipality is governed by a municipal council of elected representatives, which in turn elect a mayor.  The municipality falls under the Haugaland og Sunnhordland District Court and the Gulating Court of Appeal.

Municipal council
The municipal council of Haugesund is made up of 49 representatives that are elected every four years. The government is located at the Haugesund City Hall. The party breakdown is as follows:

Transport

Haugesund Airport, located on the island of Karmøy to the southwest of Haugesund in Karmøy municipality, has year-round flights to Oslo and Gdańsk in addition to some seasonal and charter destinations. The Norwegian airline Coast Air was based at Haugesund airport, but filed for bankruptcy on 23 January 2008.

The European Route E39 bypasses Haugesund to the east, passing through Aksdal. The European Route E134 leads eastwards to Drammen outside Oslo.

The bus station in Haugesund is located at Flotmyr on the east side of the downtown area. Long-distance bus services are available to Stavanger, Bergen, and Oslo. The local bus transport is operated by Vy Buss, on a contract with Kolumbus.

The town is connected to the island of Utsira by car ferry, and to the islands of Røvær and Feøy by passenger ferry. Until 2008, the Newcastle–Bergen–Stavanger ferry operated here as well.

Healthcare
Haugesund Hospital provides specialist health services to around 180,000 inhabitants in North Rogaland, Sunnhordland, Hardanger and Ryfylke.
The hospital offers services in both medicine and surgery, radiology / X-ray, childbirth / maternity, gynecology and fertility, habilitation and specialized treatment in mental health care. There are also more than 10 public and private health centers in the municipality for either general or specialized care, including the Privatsykehuset Haugesund.

Culture
Haugesund is the main cultural centre for its region, and is home to several festivals, the largest being the Norwegian International Film Festival and Sildajazz, an international jazz festival with approximately 70 bands and close to 200 concerts. Every August, The Norwegian Trad-jazz festival, the Sildajazz is held. Both local and international musicians are presented at the Sildajazz.

In the summer of 2004, the annual rock festival, ""RockFest"" started. It attracted local, national and international pop and rock bands, such as Elton John, Madcon, DumDum Boys and Kaizers Orchestra. The festival started as a part of the celebration of Haugesund's 150 year anniversary. In 2009, the last Rockfest was held, and  got replaced by a new concept in 2010; Haugesund Live. Haugesund Live is a series of individual concerts, and has featured bands such as The Baseballs, Kim Larsen and Mötley Crüe.

The Norwegian International Film Festival has since 1973 been held in Haugesund, premiering and showing international and Norwegian films. The Amanda Award, Norway's variation of the Oscars, has been held in Haugesund since 1985  in concurrence with the film festival.

Haugesunds Avis is a daily newspaper published in Haugesund, but with branches in Bømlo, Kopervik, Odda, Sauda and Stord. Founded in 1895, it is today owned by the investment group Mecom Group, and is as such part of the media group Edda Media. In 2006, Haugesunds Avis had a circulation of 33 448. As of 2007, the executive editor is Tonny Nundal. The newspaper owns the local radio channel Radio 102.

Churches
The Church of Norway has three parishes within the municipality of Haugesund. It is part of the Haugaland prosti (deanery) in the Diocese of Stavanger.

Education
The main campus of Stord/Haugesund University College is located in Haugesund. Established in 1994, it is the result of the merger between Haugesund Nursing College, Stord Teachers College, and Stord Nursing College. The university college has approximately 2700 students and 260 employees, thus making it one of the smallest university colleges in Norway.

The county of Rogaland operates four high schools in Haugesund. The schools Skeisvang and Vardafjell prepare pupils for further for college or university studies. The schools Haugaland and Karmsund are vocational high schools. In addition, the private Haugesund Toppidrettsgymnas has a sports-oriented high school program.

The municipality has seven pure elementary schools of grades 1 to 7 (Saltveit, Gard, Austrheim, Solvang, Lillesund, Rossabø, and Brakahaug), two pure middle schools of grades 8 to 10 (Haraldsvang and Håvåsen) and three grade 1 to 10 schools (Hauge, Røvær, and Skåredalen). In addition, the Breidablik school offers elementary and middle school courses to new foreigners and refugees. The two private schools are Steinerskolen offering a Waldorf education program, and Danielsen, a Christian school offering courses for grades 8 and 9.

Sports

Football (soccer)
The strongest local football team is FK Haugesund that has stayed in the Norwegian Premier League since 2010. The team plays its home matches at Haugesund Stadion.

Other local football teams are Vard Haugesund, Djerv 1919 and SK Haugar.

Other sports
Haugesund IL, athletics.
Haugesund Seagulls, ice hockey
Haugesund Turnforening, gymnastics

International relations

Twin towns – sister cities
Haugesund has sister city agreements with the following places:
  Ekenäs, Uusimaa, Finland
  Emden, Lower Saxony, Germany
  Søllerød, Hovedstaden, Denmark
  Ystad, Skåne, Sweden

Each of the sister cities (with exception of Emden) has given its name to a street in Haugesund. The streets are located in the same area near the border to the neighbouring municipality.

Notable people

 Eivind Nielsen (1864–1939) a Norwegian painter and illustrator of children's books
 Egil Eide (1868–1946) a silent film actor and director 
 Henrik Børseth (1885–1970) a Norwegian actor 
 Ellen Sinding (1899–1980) a Norwegian actress and dancer 
 Tollak B. Sirnes (1922–2009) a physician, psychiatrist and pharmacologist
 Olle Johan Eriksen (1923–1999) politician, Mayor of Haugesund 1970's
 Odd Langholm (born 1928) an economist and historian of economic thought
 Jacob Stolt-Nielsen (1931–2015) entrepreneur, founded Stolt-Nielsen, a parcel tanker firm
 Hanne Krogh (born 1956) singer and actress, won the Eurovision Song Contest 1985
 Jon Fosse (born 1959) is a Norwegian author and dramatist 
 Turid Birkeland (1962–2015) a cultural executive and former politician
 Steffen Kverneland (born 1963) a Norwegian illustrator and comics writer
 Kjetil Steensnæs (born 1976)  jazz musician, plays guitar, dobro and banjo
 Captain Frodo (born 1976) a Guinness World Record breaking contortionist, lives in Australia
 Gunhild Stordalen (born 1979) a Norwegian physician and environmental advocate
 Susanne Sundfør (born 1986) a singer-songwriter and record producer

US emigrants 
 Gunvald Aus (1851–1950) an engineer, built the Woolworth Building in NYC
 Hannah Kallem (1865-1937) American Army nurse, served in the Spanish–American War
 Martin Edward Mortensen (1897–1981) the son of an emigrant from the village of Skjold near Haugesund, was listed as father on Monroe's birth certificate. A statue of Marilyn Monroe by Nils Aas stands in the harbour of Haugesund.
 Sigmund R. Petersen (born ca.1940) emigrated in 1948 to the United States and became a rear admiral and fourth Director of the NOAA Commissioned Officer Corps

Sport 

 Stig Traavik (born 1967) a former judoka at 1992 Summer Olympics and diplomat.
 Egil Østenstad (born 1972) former footballer with 334 club caps and 18 for Norway
 Trygve Nygaard (born 1975) a retired footballer with over 300 club caps
 Kenneth Høie (born 1979) a former football goalkeeper with 330 club caps
 Svein Oddvar Moen (born 1979) a Norwegian football referee
 Susanne Wigene (born 1978) a middle and long-distance runner 
 Christian Grindheim (born 1983) a retired footballer with 530 club caps and 54 for Norway
 Tor Arne Andreassen (born 1983) former footballer, played 334 games with FK Haugesund
 Alexander Søderlund (born 1987) a footballer with over 300 club caps and 32 for Norway
 Sven Erik Bystrøm (born 1992) a Norwegian road bicycle racer

See also
Privatsykehuset Haugesund

References

External links

Municipal fact sheet from Statistics Norway 

Tourist information (English, German and Norwegian language)
Municipality website (Norwegian language)
Haugalandet.net
Haraldshaugen, the national monument

 
Municipalities of Rogaland
1855 establishments in Norway